John Morrison Caie  LLD (20 August 1878 – 22 December 1949) was a Scottish civil servant and poet. His poetry centres upon rural life in north-east Scotland.

Life

Caie was born in Banchory and raised in Fochabers, Moray. He was the son of the Rev William S. Caie, minister of Enzie parish church, in Banffshire, and Helen Smith Scott.

He was educated at Milne's Institute in Fochabers, and graduated from the University of Aberdeen (MA, BL, BSc). A lawyer and agronomist, he became a civil servant at the Board of Agriculture for Scotland in 1912 and rose to the level of Depute Secretary 1939-1945 (during the critical period of World War II).

He was elected a Fellow of the Royal Society of Edinburgh in 1940, one of his proposers being James Couper Brash.

He was a noted poet, writing on subjects drawn from the rural culture of northeast Scotland. He is best known nowadays for his humorous poem, The Puddock, one of many that he wrote in his native Doric dialect. The poem has become a favourite piece to teach to children in Scottish primary schools.

In 1945, Aberdeen University awarded him an honorary doctorate (LLD).

He died in Aberdeen on 22 December 1949.

Family

He married Mary Macleod in 1908.

Selected bibliography

 The Kindly North: verse in Scots and English (Aberdeen: D. Wyllie & Son, 1934)
 Twixt Hills and Sea: verse in Scots and English (Aberdeen: D. Wyllie & Son, 1939)

References

External links
 
 
 

Caie, John Morrison
Caie, John Morrison
People from Banchory
Alumni of the University of Aberdeen
Companions of the Order of the Bath
Caie, John Morrison
Fellows of the Royal Society of Edinburgh
Scottish agronomists
Scottish civil servants
Scottish lawyers
Scottish poets